Ashley Ridge High School is a secondary school located in Dorchester County, South Carolina, United States. It is the newest high school in Dorchester School District Two. The school opened in August 2008.

Band
The ARHS winter ensembles are the first teams to achieve state titles in ARHS school history. The winter guard won state in 2010, 2012, 2013, and 2022 and the indoor percussion ensemble won state in 2010, 2011, and 2013.

Facilities
In the 2014–2015 school year, construction began on an extension of the fine arts hallway and the parking lots.

References

External links
 Ashley Ridge High School website
 Ashley Ridge Bands homepage
 Ashley Ridge athletics homepage

Public high schools in South Carolina
Schools in Dorchester County, South Carolina
2008 establishments in South Carolina